Danny Noppert (born 31 December 1990) is a Dutch professional darts player who plays in Professional Darts Corporation (PDC) events. He is a former BDO World Darts Championship finalist, as well as being a Finder Darts Masters champion in 2017, before switching to the PDC in 2018, where he won the 2022 UK Open.

Career

BDO
In 2013, Noppert reached the televised stages of the Winmau World Masters. Then he beat Jeffrey de Graaf and Dennis Nilsson 3–0 to book his places in the quarter-final, where he was beaten 3–1 by Darryl Fitton. He also made his debut at the Zuiderduin Masters. After beating Darryl Fitton 5–4 in his first match, he lost to Tony O'Shea 5–3 in the second game to be knocked out in the group stages.

Noppert reached in 2015 the last 16 of the Winmau World Masters. He also qualified for the Zuiderduin Masters. A 5–2 victory and a 5–4 defeat to Scott Mitchell were enough to come through the group stage. Then he beat Darryl Fitton 3–0 in the quarters to reach the semis, where he lost 3–1 to Martin Adams.

Noppert started off 2016 well by reaching the final of the Dutch Open, in which he lost to Martin Adams 3–1. Two weeks later, Noppert won the Scottish Open, having beaten Dean Reynolds 6–0 in the final. Noppert won also the Masters of Waregem, where he defeated Geert De Vos 3–1 in the final.

Noppert impressed during 2016 Grand Slam of Darts, beating Mensur Suljović and Nathan Aspinall before losing a high quality last 16 match with two-time PDC World Champion Gary Anderson 10–9. 

In 2017, Noppert was able to reach the finals of the 2017 BDO World Darts Championship, defeating defending champion Scott Waites on his way there. Noppert eventually lost to then-BDO world number one Glen Durrant 7–3. 

Noppert's first year in the PDC was quiet until December. He failed to move past the group stage of the 2017 Grand Slam of Darts, losing to Daryl Gurney 5–1 and Darren Webster 5–2, but did notch a victory by beating Mark Webster 5–2.

On December 10th, 2017, Noppert won the WDF Finder Darts Masters event, beating Jim Williams in the final 5–3, This was Noppert's first TV title.

PDC
Noppert announced he would move to the Professional Darts Corporation following the 2018 BDO World Darts Championship, and he entered the 2018 Q-School. He won a two-year Tour Card by finishing top of the European Order of Merit, and took one of six wild cards.

In his first year on the circuit he managed to qualify for the first televised tournament of the year, the UK Open in March, where he lost at the last 96 stage. He qualified for six European Tour events where he got good results. He made it to two semi finals, which means he will make his debut at the European Championship in October. He played on all 22 non-televised Players Championships and manage to win one and scoop the £10,000 first prize. Two days later he made his debut in the prestigious World Grand Prix tournament. His good results on the floor tournaments means he will also make his debut at the Players Championship Finals late November.

In March 2022, he won his first PDC major by winning the 2022 UK Open, beating Ryan Meikle, Devon Petersen, Dirk van Duijvenbode, Damon Heta, and William O'Connor on his way to the final, where he beat Michael Smith 11-10 in a last leg decider, surviving a match dart from Smith in the process. This win increased Noppert's PDC Order of Merit ranking to 12th. Noppert represented the Netherlands in the non-ranking 2022 PDC World Cup of Darts alongside fellow Dutchman Dirk van Duijvenbode; this was Noppert's second appearance in the event. The Dutch team was defeated in the semi-final by Wales, represented by Jonny Clayton and Gerwyn Price.

Noppert entered the 2022 World Matchplay as the 11th seed based on his standing in the Order of Merit. He defeated Brendan Dolan, Daryl Gurney, and Dirk van Duijvenbode en route to the event's semi-final stage, where he was beaten 17-11 by Gerwyn Price. The £50,000 prize money for reaching the prestigious event's semi-final helped elevate him to a career-high 10th place on the PDC ranking Order of Merit as of August 2022.

World Championship results

BDO
 2017: Runner-up (lost to Glen Durrant 3–7)
 2018: Second round (lost to Mark McGeeney 1–4)

PDC
 2019: Second round (lost to Max Hopp 0–3)
 2020: Third round (lost to Kim Huybrechts 2–4)
 2021: Third round (lost to Dave Chisnall 2–4)
 2022: Third round (lost to Ryan Searle 2–4)
 2023: Third round (lost to Alan Soutar 2–4)

Career finals

BDO major finals: 2 (1 title, 1 runner-up)

PDC major finals: 2 (1 title, 1 runner-up)

Performance timeline

BDO

PDC

PDC European Tour

References

External links

{{#ifexpr:<21|}}

Living people
Dutch darts players
British Darts Organisation players
People from Friesland (district)
1990 births
Professional Darts Corporation current tour card holders
PDC ranking title winners
PDC World Cup of Darts Dutch team
UK Open champions